is the fourth studio album by Japanese singer/songwriter Chisato Moritaka, released on July 25, 1989 by Warner Pioneer. It features two versions of Moritaka's cover of the 1971 Saori Minami song "17-sai". The album is themed around Moritaka's awareness of being an idol, with songs addressing her flaws, failed romances, and interactions with her fans.

The album peaked at No. 2 on Oricon's albums chart and sold over 216,000 copies. It was also Moritaka's first album to be certified Gold by the RIAJ.

Track listing

Personnel 
 Chisato Moritaka – vocals, synthesizer percussion (8)
 Hideo Saitō – all instruments, programming, backing vocals (all tracks except where indicated)
 Yuichi Takahashi – guitar, keyboards, backing vocals (3, 9); bass, tambourine (13)
 Akira Wada – guitar (8)
 Yukio Seto – guitar (13)
 Yasuaki Maejima – piano (8)
 Naoki Suzuki – synthesizers (3, 9)
 Hiromichi Tsugaki – synthesizers (8)
 Kazuyoshi Yamauchi – bass (3, 9)
 Hiroshi Sawada – bass (8)
 Naoki Kimura – drums (3, 9) 
 Mansaku Kimura – drums (8)
 Carlos Kanno – tambourine, percussion (3, 8)
 Kenji Yoshida – trumpet (8)
 Masahiro Kobayashi – trumpet (8)
 Osamu Matsuki – trombone (8)
 Hisashi Yoshinaga – alto saxophone (8)
 Takeru Muraoka – alto saxophone (8)
 Carnation (1, 6, 11)
 Masataro Naoe – acoustic and electric guitars, backing vocals
 Giro Bando – guitar
 Yuji Mada – bass
 Yuichi Tanaya – keyboards, backing vocals
 Hiroshi Yabe – drums

Charts

Certification

References

External links 
 
 
 

1989 albums
Chisato Moritaka albums
Japanese-language albums
Warner Music Japan albums